Sohnsia is a genus of  plants in the grass family. The only known species is Sohnsia filifolia, native to the States of San Luis Potosí and Querétaro in northeastern Mexico. It is dioecious, with its chromosome number being 2n = 20.

References

Chloridoideae
Monotypic Poaceae genera
Endemic flora of Mexico